Hřebeč is a municipality and village in Kladno District in the Central Bohemian Region of the Czech Republic. It has about 2,100 inhabitants.

Administrative parts
The village of Netřeby is an administrative part of Hřebeč.

Notable people
Karel Šiktanc (1928–2021), poet and children's writer

References

Villages in Kladno District